Phoebe Wahl is an illustrator, sculptor and children's book author from the United States. She is the author of Sonya's Chickens, for which she earned the Ezra Jack Keats Book Award for New Illustrator and a Kirkus Star. Her primary media are watercolor, collage and fabric sculpture. Wahl's work deals with "themes of comfort, nostalgia and intimacy with nature and one another".

Wahl was unschooled as a child in Washington state and pursued her interest in drawing. While a student at the Rhode Island School of Design she began to focus on children's books and created early drafts of Sonya's Chickens. She graduated from RISD in 2013 with a Bachelor of Fine Arts degree in Illustration.

In addition to children's content, Wahl creates illustrations for merchandise, apparel and stationery for independent sale and for companies such as Patagonia and Bison Bookbinding. She is a contributor to Taproot Magazine and also creates personal work including a zine about her complex experience with miscarriage, illustrations inspired by her passion for women's issues, and reactions to world events such as the 2016 United States presidential election. Wahl currently resides in Bellingham, Washington.

Bibliography
 Sonya's Chickens (2015)
 Backyard Fairies (2018)
The Blue House (2020) 
Little Witch Hazel (2021)
Phoebe's Diary (2023)

As contributor
 Jenny Volvovski, Julia Rothman, and Matt Lamothe, The Who, the What, and the When: 65 Artists Illustrate the Secret Sidekicks (2014)

References

Year of birth missing (living people)
Living people
Rhode Island School of Design alumni
People from Bellingham, Washington
American women painters
American women sculptors
21st-century American sculptors
21st-century American painters
21st-century American women artists